Agyneta fuscipalpa is a species of sheet weaver spider found in the Palearctic. It was described by C. L. Koch in 1836.

References

fuscipalpa
Spiders described in 1836
Spiders of Europe
Palearctic spiders